Wiltshire Archaeological and Natural History Magazine is a county journal published by the Wiltshire Archaeological and Natural History Society (WANHS), based in Devizes, England. It has been published almost annually since 1854 and is distributed to the Society's members and subscribers, and exchanged with other linked societies.

Online availability 
The Biodiversity Heritage Library, in partnership with the Internet Archive and the Natural History Museum Library, London, has a near-complete set of scanned volumes. , the collection goes as far as volume 106 (2013).

References

External links
 WANHM on the Wiltshire Archaeological and Natural History Society website
WANHM at the Biodiversity Heritage Library – with navigable list of volumes
WANHM at the Internet Archive
 WANHM at Google Books

Annual magazines published in the United Kingdom
Archaeology magazines
History magazines published in the United Kingdom
History magazines
History of Wiltshire
Magazines established in 1853
Mass media in Wiltshire